Schofields was a department store that operated on the Headrow in Leeds, England, from 1901 to 1996. For much of the 20th century Schofields was regarded as being the pinnacle of shopping in Leeds city centre.

The site is now home to The Core, formerly The Headrow Centre. Schofields also had department stores in Harrogate (an acquisition of a former Debenhams department store, named Cresta House, on James Street), Skipton (an acquisition of the former Ledgard & Wynn department store) (closed 1986) and Sheffield (a 1972 acquisition of the Cockaynes department store on Angel Street). The Sheffield store closed in 1982 and now trades as Argos on the ground floor with offices on the upper floors and the Harrogate branch now trades as Hoopers. The only visible evidence pointing to the existence of Schofields in Leeds was a NCP multi-storey car park, located near to the former department store premises, on Albion Street that continued to use the name of 'Schofields Car Park' despite the demise of this department store (but was rebranded in 2009 as "The Core" car park).

History
The store was founded by Snowden Schofield on Saturday 4 May 1901 in a single unit as a "fancy drapers and milliners" with a staff of two then expanded in the following years into other units. The premises were originally a mixture of Victorian era buildings which included a shopping arcade, called the Victoria Arcade, running through the store.

The Leeds store was rebuilt in 1962 in a modernist style typical of the era. In September 1984 the business was sold to Clayform Properties Ltd who had intended to redevelop the site but planning permission was not granted. In 1988 the store was sold to the Al Fayed brothers who also owned Harrods and were then owners of House of Fraser. Following this, the store, whilst retaining the Schofields name, became part of the House of Fraser chain . This led to the 1987 reconstruction of the 1960s store which included reducing the size of the actual store and creating an adjoining shopping centre which became known as the Schofields Centre. During the construction work Schofields was located on Briggate in a former Woolworths store. With the opening of the new Schofields in 1990 it was decided that the temporary store on Briggate would be retained by the company and be known as Rackhams, another trading name used by House of Fraser. The new Schofields on the Headrow closed down on 27 July 1996 due to competition from the other House of Fraser store on Briggate and as a result of consolidation by House of Fraser as a whole.  This Briggate store is now known simply as House of Fraser.

Schofield Centre

The new Schofields Centre opened with other retailers renting retail units. These included HMV and Marks & Spencer. Marks & Spencer later closed this outlet due to the expansion of their premises on nearby Briggate and HMV moved into the former M&S in about 1996.

The former Schofields premises which had become the Schofields Centre subsequently became known as The Headrow Centre. This centre had been occupied by Lillywhites sportswear retailer between 1996 and 2001 and was later occupied by several chain stores including Sports Direct, New Look and HMV. The Headrow Centre management has recently let most of the tenancy agreements run out in order to redevelop the premises in the hope of attracting more business. The decision to let tenancy agreements expire, whilst only giving the shops 28 days notice of the closure in most cases, has caused negative media comments to be directed towards the centre. Many of the stores that have been in the centre for up to 15 years are being forced to close down and the staff are being given very little time to find new jobs. It is also seen as the centre 'killing' off the small businesses in order to attract more chain stores. The renovations are estimated to take 18 months to complete and 10 stores will be remaining open while the work is going on.

The new centre has been finished in late 2009 and now trades as The Core due to its place in the core of the city centre. The Core is home to new stores including a Bank and JD Sports combined store, a Cotswold Outdoor Clothing, and a USC. A new food court seating 500 people was intended to be located above New Look. The design features include the extensive use of glass. The developer, the Propinvest Group, has described the Leeds development as its flagship centre.

However, as of July 2011 many interior retail units within The Core remain vacant and the proposed food court has since been occupied by a gymnasium.

References

External links
Leodis: 1949 Image of first incarnation of Schofields
Leodis: 1967 Image of 1962–1988 Schofields building
Leodis: 1999 Image of former Schofields whilst it was a branch of Lillywhites
Schofields on Discovering Leeds
Secret Leeds Thread on the Schofield's Department Store

Buildings and structures in Leeds
Defunct retail companies of the United Kingdom
Defunct department stores of the United Kingdom
British companies established in 1901
1901 establishments in England
British companies disestablished in 1996
1996 disestablishments in England
House of Fraser
Defunct companies based in Leeds
Shopping centres in Leeds